Chashin (also Romanized as Chashīn and Cheshīn) is a village in Dowlatabad Rural District, in the Central District of Abhar County, Zanjan Province, Iran. At the 2006 census, its population was 359, in 73 families.

References 

Populated places in Abhar County